James Atkins (born 22 July 1979 in London) is a British professional wrestler best known under his ring name James Mason.

Career
A childhood fan of Big Daddy, Atkins began wrestling for All Star Wrestling in 1993, adopting the ringname James Mason, after the film actor of the same name at the behest of ring announcer John Harris.  Early in his career, he also wrestled for Welsh promoter Orig Williams under the name Jesse James (as Williams felt the actor in question was "boring" and this would reflect poorly on Atkins). In 1995, Mason was named by All Star as "Young Wrestler of 1995" and was interviewed by Simon Garfield for his book The Wrestling. In early 1996, he won a tournament promoted by Rumble Promotions for the World Middleweight Title left vacant by Danny Collins when he moved up the weights.  Mason lost the title to Mal Sanders a month later.

Mason, Dean Allmark and Doug Williams all faced and lost to Kendo Nagasaki in a December 2001 four-way match at the Victoria Hall in Hanley, promoted as Nagasaki's retirement match.  Mason was the final opponent eliminated by Nagasaki to win the match. In 2002, he and Sanders feuded for the British Middleweight Title in TWA with the belt passing back and forth between them.

During the early 2000s he tag-teamed with Chad Collyer in Japan for Michinoku Pro.  In 2003, while going through a temporary heel phase, Mason reached the final of a tournament for the vacant World Heavy-Middleweight title before losing to the American Dragon in the final at Croydon.

In the United States, James Mason is best known as being the Captain of Team Britain in Total Nonstop Action Wrestling during America's X-Cup Tournament in 2004. Team Britain consisted of Mason, Robbie Dynamite, Dean Allmark, and Frankie Sloan. Although Mason had several victories in America's X-Cup, Team Britain ended up being in last place. The Tournament was won and virtually dominated by Team Mexico. After America's X-Cup ended, Team Britain did not return for the TNA 2004 World X-Cup Tournament.

Mason wrestled in All Star Wrestling usually as a blue-eye, using the name James Mason, and as a heel often on the same event, under a mask, using the name Tagori.  In November 2006, Mason defeated three former champions Drew McDonald, Doug Williams, and Robbie Brookside in a 4-way elimination match to win the vacant British Heavyweight title which he later lost to Brody Steele in 2007.  In November 2008 Mason competed for World Wrestling Entertainment at the Manchester Evening News Arena, defeating Montel Vontavious Porter.

Mason won a six-man one-night tournament at a Welsh Wrestling's King of the Castle in Harlech, Wales on 1 May 2010 to become the first Welsh Heavyweight Champion, as recognized by the Union of European Wrestling Alliances. He defeated JD Knight in a semi-final match, then defeated Kade Callous and Danny Garnell in a three-way final. Mason lost the Welsh Heavyweight Championship to Kade Callous on 23 October 2010 in Builth Wells after a six-month title reign. Mason has continued to wrestle for Alan Ravenhill's Welsh promotion on a regular basis, and is regarded as one of the most popular and polished performers in Welsh Wrestling.

Alongside his appearances for All Star and promoting his own shows and hiring out his ring, Mason also wrestled for International Pro Wrestling: United Kingdom, LDN and several other promotions.

Mason became a trainer in the UK-based WWE Performance Center facility for the now-defunct NXT UK brand. His legacy, alongside fellow trainers Johnny Moss, Johnny Saint and Robbie Brookside, was acknowledged in the build-up promo for the Noam Dar vs Mark Coffey match for the NXT UK Heritage Cup on August 31, 2022.

Championships and accomplishments
All Star Wrestling
ASW British Heavyweight Championship (1 time)
European Heavyweight Championship (1 time)
King of the Ring (2014)
British Wrestling Alliance
BWA Heavyweight Championship (1 time)
European Wrestling Promotion
Manfred Koch Memorial Cup (2002)
Power of Wrestling
POW Intercontinental Championship (1 time)
POW Tag Team Championship (2 times) - with Adrian Severe (1) and Murat Bosporus (1)
Rumble Promotions
World Middleweight Championship (1 time)
South West Wrestling
SWW BritPro Cup Championship (1 time, current)
United Kingdom Pro Wrestling
UKPW World Championship (1 time)
Rampage Rumble (2016)
Union of European Wrestling Alliances 
European Heavyweight Championship (1 time)
Welsh Wrestling
Welsh Heavyweight Championship (1 time)
Welsh Heavyweight Championship Tournament (2010)
King of the Castle Tournament (2011)
The Wrestling Alliance
British Middleweight Championship (1 time)

See also
X Division
TNA X-Cup Tournaments

References

External links
TNAWrestling.com (The Official Website of TNA Wrestling)

Living people
English male professional wrestlers
1979 births